Nidirana hainanensis is a species of frog in the family Ranidae. It is endemic to Hainan Island, China. Described in 2007, it is only known from its type locality, Mount Diaoluo in Lingshui Li Autonomous County. It most closely resembles Nidirana adenopleura, a more widespread frog from southern and south-eastern China and Taiwan.

References

Amphibians of China
Endemic fauna of Hainan
Amphibians described in 2007